Air Arabia serves the following destinations .

The airline's first destination was Manama, Bahrain in 2003.

The list also includes destinations served by Air Arabia Egypt and Air Arabia Maroc: as well as those of defunct subsidiaries Air Arabia Jordan and Fly Yeti.

References

Lists of airline destinations